East is a cardinal direction or compass point.

East or the East may also refer to:

Geography

Global context
Eastern world, the region comprising Asia and the Middle East
Far East, the region comprising East Asia and Southeast Asia
Eastern Bloc, the Soviet Union and other states in the Warsaw Pact during the Cold War
 The Orient, an early-modern term for lands in Near East and Far East

National context
East (Cornish hundred), a division of the UK country of England
East (European Parliament constituency), a constituency in the Republic of Ireland
East, West Virginia, an unincorporated community in the United States
East Coast of the United States, the easternmost coast of the United States along the Atlantic Ocean
Eastern United States, a term often describing the U.S. states east of the Mississippi River
Eastern Roman Empire, the predominantly Greek-speaking continuation of the Roman Empire during Late Antiquity and the Middle Ages

Acronyms 
 European Association for Solar Telescopes, a consortium for the development of the European Solar Telescope
 Experimental Advanced Superconducting Tokamak, a nuclear fusion experiment facility in China
 East Asia School of Theology, in Singapore
 Eastern Association for the Surgery of Trauma, an American medical association
 Easter Island Standard Time, UTC-6:00 with UTC-5:00 at daylight saving time

Arts and literature 
East (novel), a 2003 novel by Edith Pattou
East (play), a 1975 play by Steven Berkoff

Film and TV
The East (2013 film), a film directed by Zal Batmanglij
The East (2020 film), a Dutch war film
The East (TV series), a 2015 Indonesian TV series
 East (The Walking Dead), an episode of the TV series The Walking Dead

Music
East!, a 1968 album by jazz guitarist Pat Martino
East (Cold Chisel album), 1980
 East (Justin Rutledge album), 2016
 East (EP), an EP by Ego Likeness
"East", track by Pat Martino on East!
"East", song by Billy Paul
"East", song by Earl Sweatshirt from the EP Feet of Clay

Other uses 
 East (surname), various people with the surname
 East Bay, a portion of the San Francisco Bay Area
 East River (disambiguation)
 The East (Brooklyn), a black nationalist community center established in 1969

See also 
East Point (disambiguation)
Eastern (disambiguation)
Est (disambiguation), French for east
Este (disambiguation), Spanish for east
Higashi (disambiguation), Japanese for east
Azuma (disambiguation), Japanese for east